Mrđanovci is a village in the municipality of Kupres, Republika Srpska, Bosnia and Herzegovina and partially in the Federation of Bosnia and Herzegovina.

Demographics 
According to the 2013 census, its population was 13, all Serbs in the FBIH part and 84 in the RS part.

References

Populated places in Kupres, Republika Srpska
Populated places in Kupres